

English

Etymology 
Apostrophe + ectomy

Noun 
apostrophectomy (plural apostrophectomies)

 The removal of incorrect apostrophes, especially those wrongly used to form plurals (greengrocers' apostrophes)